Frédéric-François-Louis Perrier (22 May 1849 – 16 May 1913) was a Swiss politician and member of the Swiss Federal Council (1912–1913). , he is the member with the shortest time in office (14 months).

Biography

Perrier was born in Neuchâtel, Switzerland. He was the uncle of Denise and Raymonde Berthoud and was the eldest child of architect Louis-Daniel Perrier and Cécile Dardel. At the age of 19, he went to study in Stuttgart, Germany. He obtained his architect degree from the Swiss Federal Institute of Technology Zurich. He first acquired work experience with his father and participating in the construction of the International Bureau of Weights and Measures in Sèvres. After this his real career as an architect began. The University of Neuchâtel and the Hôtel des Postes de La-Chaux-de-Fonds are two among many of his prestigious works.
In 1889 he became a member of the Grand Conseil neuchâtelois before becoming a member of the Conseil national of the Canton of Neuchâtel in 1902. From 1903 to 1912, Perrier was a member of the Conseil d'Etat of the Canton of Neuchâtel (cantonal government). He was affiliated to the Free Democratic Party. He presided the Conseil d'Etat twice: 1905/1906 and 1909/1910.

He was elected to the Federal Council on 12 March 1912 and died in office the subsequent year on 16 May 1913. During his time in office he held the following departments:
Department of Posts and Railways (1912)
Department of Home Affairs (1913)

As a single, Perrier also manage to find the time to pursue an impressive military career. He became colonel in 1896 and between 1902 and 1905, commanded the génie du 1er corps d'armée and the forts de Saint-Maurice troops.

Quai Louis-Perrier in Neuchâtel is named after him.

References
Dictionnaire biographique des cent premiers conseillers fédéraux - Urs Altermatt, 1993 (p. 312-315)

 http://www.ne.ch/neat/site/jsp/rubrique/rubrique.jsp?DocId=4679

External links

1849 births
1913 deaths
People from Neuchâtel
Swiss Calvinist and Reformed Christians
Free Democratic Party of Switzerland politicians
Members of the Federal Council (Switzerland)
Members of the National Council (Switzerland)
ETH Zurich alumni